Eyassu Worku (Amharic: እያሱ ወርቁ; born 18 October 1998) is an American basketball player of Ethiopian descent.

Early and personal life
Eyassu Worku was born in the United States to Ethiopian immigrants Shibeshi and Yodit Berhanu. 

Worku originally played more soccer than basketball. He completely switched to basketball in high school.

Worku's former fellow UC Irvine wingman Evan Leonard is a childhood friend. Just like Worku, Leonard went on to play professionally in North Macedonia.

High school and college career
Worku left Los Alamitos High School as its all-time leading scorer. In 2017, he led his team to an undefeated Sunset League championship. 

Worku played 119 games for the Los Alamitos Griffins over four years and piled up 1,777 points, good enough for highest career total in school history, breaking Landry Fields’ record. Worku shot 44 percent from the field and 78 percent from the free-throw line.

He played for the 2018–19 UC Irvine Anteaters team under head coach Russell Turner.  As starter at point guard, he helped his team win the 2019 Big West Conference tournament.

References

External links
Profile at Eurobasket.com
Profile at RealGM
UC Irvine Anteaters bio  
Profile at Basketball-Reference.com
Profile at ABA League

1998 births
Living people
American expatriate basketball people in Croatia
American expatriate basketball people in North Macedonia
American men's basketball players
American people of Ethiopian descent
Basketball players from California
Guards (basketball)
KK Zadar players
People from Los Alamitos, California
UC Irvine Anteaters men's basketball players